This is a list of countries by time devoted to leisure and personal care, as published by the OECD.

The reference year is 2016 for the United States; 2014-15 for the United Kingdom; 2011 for Japan; 2010 for Canada, Norway, South Africa; 2009-10 for Estonia, Finland, France, New Zealand, Spain; 2009 for South Korea; 2008-09 for Austria, Italy; 2006 for Australia; 2005 for Belgium; 2003-04 for Poland; 2003 for Latvia; 2001-02 for Germany; 2001 for Denmark; 2000-01 for Slovenia and Sweden.

As defined by the OECD, "Leisure includes a wide range of indoor and outdoor activities such as walking and hiking, sports, entertainment and cultural activities, socializing with friends and family, volunteering, taking a nap, playing games, watching television, using computers, recreational gardening, etc.
Personal care activities include sleeping (but not taking a nap), eating and drinking, and other household or medical or personal services (hygiene, visits to the doctor, hairdresser, etc.) consumed by the respondent. Travel time related to personal care is also included. The information is generally collected through national time use surveys, which involve respondents keeping a diary of their activities over one or several representative days for a given period."

See also
Quality of life

References

Leisure
International quality of life rankings